Herbert Tiede (3 March 1915 – 12 January 1987) was a German actor. He appeared in more than one hundred films from 1943 to 1975.

Filmography

References

External links 

1915 births
1987 deaths
German male film actors